Charles Edwin Mitchell (October 6, 1877 – December 14, 1955) was an American banker whose incautious securities policies facilitated the speculation which led to the Crash of 1929. First National City Bank's (now Citibank) abuses under his leadership brought an end to ownership of investment affiliates by commercial banks.

Early life and education
Mitchell was born in Chelsea, Massachusetts, where his father, George Edwin Mitchell, worked for a produce dealer and served as mayor from 1887 until 1888. Mitchell graduated from Amherst College in 1899, after which he got a job with the Western Electric Company in Chicago.

Career
In 1903, he became assistant to its president. After three years, he left the firm and moved to New York City, where he became assistant to the president of The Trust Company of America.  Between 1911 and 1916, he ran his own investment house, C. E. Mitchell & Company.  In 1916, he became vice-president of National City Company, which he reorganized into a private investment banking firm.  Shortly after, he relocated to Tuxedo Park, New York.

Nicknamed "Sunshine Charley", Mitchell was elected president of National City Bank (now Citibank) in 1921 and, in 1929, was appointed chairman.  Also in 1921, he was elected president of National City Company, which became the largest security-issuing entity in the world.  Under his leadership, the bank expanded rapidly and, by 1930, had 100 branches in 23 countries outside the United States. His salesmen sold millions of shares in the bank totaling $650 million, much of which would be lost in the Crash of 1929. Indeed, while the Federal Reserve Bank was attempting to curb speculation earlier in 1929, Mitchell flaunted a $25 million advance to traders.

Arrest and acquittal
Mitchell remained chairman until 1933, when he was arrested and indicted for tax evasion by then Assistant U.S. Attorney Thomas E. Dewey.  Charges were brought following testimony by Mitchell in which he openly stated that he had sold his stake in National City Bank to avoid paying taxes.   Defended by attorney Max Steuer, he was found not guilty of all criminal charges, but the government won a million-dollar civil settlement against him. In 1933, the U.S. Senate's Pecora Commission investigated Mitchell as its first witness for his part in tens of millions of dollars in losses, excessive pay, and tax avoidance. In November 1929, U.S. Senator Carter Glass said, "Mitchell more than any 50 men is responsible for this stock crash."

His townhouse on Fifth Avenue, built for him by Walker & Gillette in 1926, with a rusticated facade in the manner of a 16th-century Roman palazzo, now houses the French consulate.

References

1877 births
1955 deaths
American bankers
Businesspeople from New York City
Citigroup people
People from Chelsea, Massachusetts
American financiers
People from the Upper East Side
Amherst College alumni